The North Warning System (NWS) is a joint United States and Canadian early-warning radar system for the atmospheric air defense of North America. It provides surveillance of airspace from potential incursions or attacks from across North America's polar region. It replaced the Distant Early Warning Line system in the late 1980s.

Overview

The NWS consists of both long range AN/FPS-117 and short range AN/FPS-124 surveillance radars, operated and maintained by North American Aerospace Defense Command (NORAD). There are 13 long range sites and 36 short range sites. 

In Canada, the station sites are owned or leased by the Government of Canada, which also owns most of the infrastructure. The radars and tactical radios are owned by the United States Air Force. The Alaska Regional Operations Control Center (ROCC) at Elmendorf AFB, Alaska controls the stations in Alaska; the Canada East and Canada West Regional Operations Control Centres (ROCCs) at CFB North Bay, Ontario control the stations in Canada. ROCC information is then passed to the NORAD Combat Operations Centre (COC) at Colorado Springs, Colorado.

Each Long Range site consists of accommodation buildings, radar towers and radomes, generator and fuel systems, satellite terminals, automated weather station, and UHF and VHF ground-air-ground radio. Short Range sites consist of a single AN/FPS-124 radar, satellite terminals, power generation and fuel systems, and a small emergency shelter that can accommodate six people. Some short range stations lack weather stations and UHF Tactical Radios.

History
The Distant Early Warning (DEW) Line, constructed in the late 1950s, was reaching obsolescence in the 1980s. With the signing of North American Air Defence Modernization agreement at the "Shamrock Summit" between Prime Minister Mulroney and President Reagan in Quebec City on 18 March 1985, the DEW Line began its eventual upgrading and transition becoming the North Warning System (NWS) of today.

The NWS began limited operation in 1988 with the commissioning and acceptance of the three newly constructed east coast sites BAF-3 Brevoort Island, Nunavut, LAB-2 Saglek and LAB-6 Cartwright, both in Labrador. Throughout the late 1980s and early 1990s, new NWS LRR radars replaced former DEW Line sites. DEW sites that were not transitioned to North Warning operation were eventually closed down. The official activation of the NWS and inactivation of the DEW Line took place on 15 July 1993.

The bi-national North Warning System Office (NWSO) is located in Ottawa, Ontario and staffed with both Canadian and American military and civilian personnel. Staffed sites are operated by the Royal Canadian Air Force, but physically staffed by civilian contractors. Logistical and maintenance support for the NWS is supplied by the Air Force Materiel Command of the United States Air Force, located at Ogden Air Logistics Center (OO-ALC), Hill Air Force Base, Utah.

Site remediation
The former DEW Line sites were operated using practices and materials accepted by the environmental standards of the time. With their closure and many of them rebuilt as NWS sites, a clean-up project was undertaken to remove surplus infrastructure, treat chemically contaminated soils, and stabilize landfill sites. The clean-up was designed to keep chemical contamination from the DEW Line sites out of the Arctic food chain, and ensure that the sites are restored to an environmentally safe condition. In 1989, the Canadian Department of National Defence (DND) started investigating the environmental conditions of the DEW Line sites and commenced clean-up work at two sites in 1996. The clean-up of 21 sites was scheduled to be completed in 2013. Currently, 14 sites have been cleaned up and the remaining seven are on-going in Nunavut.

Stations 

The NWS consists of 15 long-range radars (11 in Canada, of which eight were DEW Line sites) and 39 short-range radars (36 in Canada). Minimally-attended NWS Long Range Radar AN/FPS-117 radar sites shaded in blue.

Distant Early Warning Line sites not included 

The following table lists the DEW Line sites not included in the NWS. Most of these sites not included were Intermediate sites closed in 1963 when they were declared obsolete. The stations consisted of a module train, a warehouse, a vehicle garage, an Inuit house, POL (Petroleum, Oil, Lubricant) tanks and a continuous wave radar tower. Others were some Auxiliary sites that were replaced with new NWS stations. DEW Line stations in the Aleutian Islands of Alaska were inactivated due to budget reductions in 1969. The DYE Stations in Greenland and Iceland were transferred to the USAF Air Forces Iceland in 1980.

The primary DEW line radars were the Raytheon AN/FPS-19 long range L-Band search radar in Canada and Alaska at main and auxiliary sites; Bendix AN/FPS-30 at the four Greenland DYE radar stations. Motorola AN/FPS-23 short range search radar was installed at the Intermediate sites, used as fillers to cover any Long Range Radar surveillance gaps.

Location approximate due to low-resolution aerial imagery of area.
Site location obliterated by snow cover.

See also
 Canadian Forces base
 Joint Surveillance System
 NORAD Tracks Santa Program
 Operation Hurricane (Canada)

References

Further reading
 Lackenbauer, Farish, Arthur-Lackenbauer (2005). The Distant Early Warning (DEW) Line: A Bibliography and Documentary Resource List. The Arctic Institute of North America. .
 Contaminated Sites in Nunavut

External links
 About NORAD Public information.
 PAIL Corp. Public information from PAIL Corp.
 Technical Radar Information NWS Radar information from FAS.

Aerospace Defense Command
Canada–United States relations
Cold War military history of Canada
Cold War military history of the United States
Military globalization
Military in the Arctic
Air defence radar networks
Radar stations of the United States Air Force
Royal Canadian Air Force